The Patriotic Militia was a communist group in the Belgian resistance during the Second World War, affiliated to the Communist Party of Belgium. The Milices were intended to be a mass movement, working alongside the much smaller Partisans Armés (PA) group.

History
22,006 people are recognized to have been part of the Milices during the war.

References

Belgian resistance groups
Communism in Belgium